Nyagatare is the largest and second most populous district (akarere) in Rwanda. Located in Eastern Province, Rwanda, it occupies the northeastern extremity of Rwanda. Its capital is  Nyagatare City, the former capital of the now defunct Umutara province. 
Nyagatare District borders Uganda in the North, Tanzania in the East, Gatsibo District of the (Eastern Province) in the South, and Gicumbi District of the Northern Province in the West.
Nyagatare has an area of 1741  km2, what makes it the largest district in Rwanda. With a population of 466,944 in 2012, and 653,861 in 2023, Nyagatare is the second most populated district of Rwanda only after Gasabo District of Kigali City with 879,505 inhabitants. This is a 156% increase from 2002 when the population was only 255,104.  This sharp rise in the population is mainly due to the major movement of the population from other parts of the country in search of land.

Geography
Nyagatare is the largest district in Rwanda. Nyagatare lies in an area of grassy plains, and low hills, with excellent views in all directions, including the mountains of southern Uganda and, on a very clear day, the Virunga volcano range. The district has a higher temperature  compared to the other parts of the country. It also receives lower precipitations.
The land is not farmed as extensively as other areas of the country, and there is a large amount of cattle.
The area has a higher average daytime temperature than the Rwandan average, and lower precipitation, which come sometimes lead to droughts.
The District of Nyagatare is one of the seven districts making the Eastern Province. It is divided into 14 Sectors made of 106 cells and 630 Villages ”Imidugudu”. Spreading an area of 1.741 square kilometers, the district borders with Uganda at the north, Tanzania at its East, at the South by Gatsibo District and by Gicumbi District of the Northern Province on the Western border.

Sectors
Nyagatare district is divided into 14 sectors (imirenge): Gatunda, Kiyombe, Karama, Karangazi, Katabagemu, Matimba, Mimuli, Mukama, Musheli, Nyagatare, Rukomo, Rwempasha, Rwimiyaga and Tabagwe.

List of Nyagatare Sectors by Population (2012)

Topography
The District of Nyagatare is  characterized, in general, by lowly inclined hills separated by dry vallies for a long period of the year (June–October). The District is located in the granite low valley whose altitude is 1513,5m. This kind of topographical layout constitutes an important potentiality for modern and mechanized agriculture.

Demographics
2005 estimates showed that the total population in Nyagatare is 291.452 inhabitants whose 51%  were women. The  overage density attains 167 inhabitants/km2  which is by far lower than the national density figure–321 inhabitants/km2.  The sectors the most populated are Mimuli and Katabagemu which have 25.651  and 25.250 inhabitants, respectively.  While the less populated are Rwempasha and Matimba having respectively 13.056 and 15.396 inhabitants.

Climate
The District of Nyagatare experiences small quantity of rains and hot temperatures. It is characterized by  two main seasons: one long dry season that varies between 3 and 5 months with an annual overage  temperature  varying  between 25,3 °C et 27,7 °C. The monthly distribution of the rains varies from one year to another. Annual  rain falls are both very  weak (827 mm/an) and very unpredictable to satisfy the needs  in agriculture  and livestock.

Hydrographic Description

The hydrographic network is very limited in the District of Nyagatare. The Akagera river flows East on the border with Tanzania.  The river Kagitumba flows North on the border with Uganda. It ends in the Akagera river at the intersection of the 3 countries. The River Muvumba that cut across the District is a result of the reunion of 2 rivers: the Ngoma and the Karungeli. Rice is grown in its large valley. The river is the main water reserve for the people and the cattle in the large dry land.  There is no other consistent river that can be  exploited by the population in Nyagatare. Few of the rivers  found there such as Nyiragahaya, Kayihenda, Karuruma, Nayagasharara and Kaborogota are erratic and intermittent. The weak river network constitutes a serious handicap to responding to the needs of water for people and animals.

Fauna et Flora 

The District of Nyagatare contains half of Akagera National Park where is found a vast number of wildlife including African buffalo, antelopes and more other ruminants. Because the park is not fenced, animals can come out to cause some damages in the neighboring human inhabited areas. The River Umuvumba, contains hippopotamuses, and Nile crocodiles. During flooding, these animals can get close to populated areas with dangerous consequences. The district also accommodates a huge variety of birds such as birds of prey, guineafowl, partridges, herons etc. Hares, wild boar, monkeys and other rodents are occasionally found in the wooded savanna.

The flora in Nyagatare is made in general by an afforested savanna vegetation and gallery forests along the rivers. The latter constitutes a very precious reserve which should be rationally exploited.

Soils
The soil of this  area is characterized by the tightness of the humifere layer of the soil brought about by the grassy savanna and by the vertisoils that are rich in nutrients  mineral elements but lacking organic substances. These types of  soils may be  exploited with the help of modern agricultural techniques and form sorts of artificial pastures camps for livestock.

External links 

 
 Nyagatare District government website
 —National Institute of Statistics of Rwanda, 2012 Population and Housing Census (Provisional Results)

Nyagatare District
Districts of Rwanda
Eastern Province, Rwanda